Clara Anna Linnea Markstedt (born 20 August 1989) is a Swedish footballer who plays for Vittsjö GIK.

Artist career 

Markstedt is also an artist who exhibits her paintings.

References

External links 

 
 Profile at Swedish Football Association (SvFF) 

1989 births
Living people
Swedish women's footballers
AIK Fotboll (women) players
Piteå IF (women) players
Hammarby Fotboll (women) players
Vittsjö GIK players
Damallsvenskan players
Women's association football midfielders
21st-century Swedish painters